On 16 January 1965, a U.S. Air Force Boeing KC-135 Stratotanker crashed in the central United States, in a neighborhood in Wichita, Kansas, near McConnell Air Force Base.  This resulted in the deaths of all seven crew members on board the aircraft and an additional twenty-three people on the ground.

This accident is the deadliest aviation disaster to occur in Kansas.  It is also the second-deadliest aircraft accident in the United States involving victims on the ground, after the Green Ramp disaster in 1994, which killed 24 people on the ground.

Accident details

At 9:28 a.m. CST (3:28 p.m. UTC) on Saturday, 16 January 1965, a Boeing KC-135A-BN Stratotanker, serial number 57-1442, took off from the McConnell Air Force Base and gained very little altitude.  During this time, the aircraft began to experience a large amount of yaw, and attempted to return to the airport.  The crew then began to dump large quantities of fuel from the aircraft's refueling tanks.  Shortly after this, the aircraft made a hard bank to the left, and began to enter a roll.  Unable to recover, the aircraft crashed into a suburban neighborhood at the intersection of Piatt and 20th Street, just three minutes after take-off.  The site is several blocks northwest of Wichita State University.

The accident killed all seven crew members on the aircraft and an additional twenty-three people on the ground. In addition, at least twenty-seven people on the ground sustained injuries, three of which were serious.

It was reported that the crew entry door was jettisoned and a B-52 Stratofortress bomber, which took off prior to the KC-135, may have blown a detached drag chute from an F-105 Thunderchief against the departing aircraft.  These factors may have contributed to the crash. Recently un-redacted portions of the accident report indicate that the parachute ingested into the Number 1 engine was that of the crew member who attempted to bail out through the crew entry door. His body was found about 200 feet from the impact crater.

Aftermath
Ten months after the accident, the U.S. Air Force issued an official accident report that stated that the crash was caused by "a rudder control system malfunction," which was impossible for the crew to overcome.

In 1971, the Piatt Memorial Park was opened to serve as a local recreational facility and a reminder of the tragedy. The park features several amenities, including a playground, a drinking fountain, and a basketball court.  On July 14, 2007, more than forty-two years after the accident, an airplane-shaped twelve by twenty-two foot Imperial Black Granite monument with the names of all thirty victims of the crash inscribed on it was unveiled at a ceremony.

See also
 1972 Sacramento Canadair Sabre accident – another U.S. aircraft accident with a high number of ground fatalities
 List of accidents and incidents involving military aircraft (1960–74)
 USAir Flight 427 – a much deadlier aircraft accident also caused by a malfunction of the rudder control system

References

1965 in Kansas
Accidents and incidents involving the Boeing 707
Aviation accidents and incidents in 1965
Aviation accidents and incidents in Kansas
Accidents and incidents involving military aircraft
Accidents and incidents involving United States Air Force aircraft
January 1965 events in the United States
History of Wichita, Kansas